In mathematics and especially in algebraic combinatorics, the Stanley symmetric functions are a family of symmetric functions introduced by  in his study of the symmetric group of permutations.  

Formally, the Stanley symmetric function Fw(x1, x2, ...) indexed by a permutation w is defined as a sum of certain fundamental quasisymmetric functions.  Each summand corresponds to a reduced decomposition of w, that is, to a way of writing w as a product of a minimal possible number of adjacent transpositions.  They were introduced in the course of Stanley's enumeration of the reduced decompositions of permutations, and in particular his proof that the permutation w0 = n(n − 1)...21 (written here in one-line notation) has exactly
 
reduced decompositions.  (Here  denotes the binomial coefficient n(n − 1)/2 and ! denotes the factorial.)

Properties

The Stanley symmetric function Fw is homogeneous with degree equal to the number of inversions of w.  Unlike other nice families of symmetric functions, the Stanley symmetric functions have many linear dependencies and so do not form a basis of the ring of symmetric functions.  When a Stanley symmetric function is expanded in the basis of Schur functions, the coefficients are all non-negative integers.

The Stanley symmetric functions have the property that they are the stable limit of Schubert polynomials

where we treat both sides as formal power series, and take the limit coefficientwise.

References

Polynomials
Symmetric functions